Valvata cristata is a species of minute freshwater snail with an operculum, an aquatic gastropod mollusk or micromollusk in the family Valvatidae, the valve snails.

Distribution
 Czech Republic - Bohemia and Moravia
 Slovakia
 Poland
 Germany - (Arten der Vorwarnliste)
 Netherlands
 the British Isles: Great Britain and Ireland
 Hungary
 Kaliningrad Oblast, Russia
 and other areas

Shell description
The shell of this exceeding small (2–4 mm) Valvata species is very flat in its coiling, and therefore it somewhat resembles a Planorbis shell. However, the shell is dextral in coiling and has an operculum. The shell is transparent, has 3-3.5 whorls in a circular aperture. The umbilicus is wide and open, more than 1/3 of shell diameter.

Ecology
This species lives in stagnant and slow-moving water.

Myzyk (2002) described life cycle of Valvata cristata.

References

External links

 Valvata cristata at Animalbase taxonomy,short description, distribution, biology,status (threats), images 
Ulster Museum Image

Valvatidae
Gastropods described in 1774
Taxa named by Otto Friedrich Müller